Greek Basket League individual statistics are the season by season stats leaders of the top-tier level Greek Basket League, since the league first formed its A National Category, starting with the 1963–64 season. The season by season stats leaders in each statistical category are listed by the number of total accumulated stats in a given season, rather than by per game average, and include both the regular season and playoffs, as that is how the league counts its season by season stats leaders.

Top Scorers (since the 1963–64 season)

The Greek Basket League counts official stats leaders by stats totals, and not by per game averages. It also counts the total stats for both regular season and playoffs combined. The league first held a playoffs round in the 1986–87 season.

This list includes all of the top scorers of each season of the Greek Basket League, since the league first formed the A National Category, starting with the 1963–64 season.

Performance Index Rating leaders (since the 1993–94 season)

The Greek Basket League counts official stats leaders by stats totals, and not by per game averages. It also counts the total stats for both regular season and playoffs combined. The league first held a playoffs round in the 1986–87 season.

This list includes all of the leaders in Performance Index Rating (PIR) of each season of the Greek Basket League, starting with the 1993–94 season.

In the 2014–15 and 2015–16 seasons, the Greek Basket League's regular season PIR leader was considered to be an unofficial statistical "MVP award", that was based solely on this statistic. This is not to be confused with the official Greek Basket League MVP award, which is an award that is based on a voting process, and that is awarded at the end of each season's playoffs.

Rebounding leaders (since the 1986–87 season)

The Greek Basket League counts official stats leaders by stats totals, and not by per game averages. It also counts the total stats for both regular season and playoffs combined. The league first held a playoffs round in the 1986–87 season.

This list includes all of the top rebounders of each season of the Greek Basket League, since the league first formed the A1 National Category, starting with the 1986–87 season.

Assists leaders (since the 1988–89 season)

The Greek Basket League counts official stats leaders by stats totals, and not by per game averages. It also counts the total stats for both regular season and playoffs combined. The league first held a playoffs round in the 1986–87 season.

This list includes all of the assists leaders of each season of the Greek Basket League, since the league first formed the A1 National Category, starting with the 1988–89 season.

References

External links
Official HEBA Site 
Greek Basket League Official English Site 
Insports.gr Greek League First Scorers In Points 
Sport24.gr Greek League Season By Season Best Performers 
Eurobasket.com Greek A1 League By Season
Galanis Sports Data

statistical leaders
Basketball statistics

el:Πρώτοι σκόρερ Α' και Α1 εθνικής κατηγορίας καλαθοσφαίρισης ανδρών